Schinia biundulata is a moth of the family Noctuidae. It is found in western North America, including Arizona, California, Idaho, Nevada, Oregon, Texas  and Utah.

The wingspan is 20–22 mm.

Food
Gilia cana is used as an exclusive food plant by the larvae of the Lepidoptera species Schinia biundulata.

External links
Schinia biundulata - Images
Butterflies and Moths of North America: Schinia biundulata

Schinia
Fauna of the Western United States
Fauna of the Mojave Desert
Fauna of the Sierra Nevada (United States)
Moths of North America
Moths described in 1891